Margaret de Fiennes (after 1269 – 7 February 1333), was a French noblewoman who married an English marcher lord, Edmund Mortimer, 2nd Baron Mortimer of Wigmore, and was mother of Roger Mortimer, 1st Earl of March.

Origins
She was a daughter of Guillaume II de Fiennes (William II de Fiennes, Baron of Tingry; died 
1302) and his wife, Blanche, the daughter of Jean de Brienne (d. 1296), Grand Butler of France, and his first wife Jeanne de Châteaudun (his second marriage was to Marie de Coucy, widow of King Alexander II of Scotland).

Her grandfather, Sir John II of Brienne, was the third son of John of Brienne, King of Jerusalem and Emperor of Constantinople, and his third wife Berengaria of León, which made Margaret a cousin of Queen Eleanor of Castile. Her paternal grandparents were Enguerrand II de Fiennes and Isabel de Condé.

Her brother, Jean (d. 1340), married Isabel, daughter of Guy de Dampierre, Count of Flanders and his second wife Isabel of Luxembourg.

Life
In September 1285, when she was fourteen or fifteen years old, Margaret married Edmund Mortimer, the second son of Roger Mortimer, 1st Baron Mortimer of Wigmore and his wife Maud de Braose. He had succeeded to his father's lands and barony in 1282 and was already a national hero after killing Llywelyn ap Gruffudd, his cousin, in battle. They had eight known children.

Her husband died in 1304 and she lived until 1333, probably being buried in Wigmore Abbey.

References

Fiennes
Fiennes
Fiennes
Margaret
Margaret
English baronesses
Wives of knights